Artsyom (Artsem) Bandarenka (born June 19, 1991) is a Belarusian triple jumper. He competed at the 2016 Summer Olympics in the men's triple jump event; his result of 15.43 meters in the qualifying round did not qualify him for the final.

References

1991 births
Living people
Belarusian male triple jumpers
Olympic athletes of Belarus
Athletes (track and field) at the 2016 Summer Olympics
Olympic male triple jumpers